Yuriy Zenoviyovych Kryvoruchko (born 14 July 1966 in Lviv) is a Ukrainian politician, psychiatrist, lawyer and activist.

Early life and education 
Yuriy Kryvoruchko was born on July 14, 1966 in Lviv.

In 1989 he graduated from the Lviv Medical Institute with a degree in psychiatry.

From 1992 to 1998 he studied at the Faculty of Law of Ivan Franko Lviv State University. In 2005 he obtained Candidate of Sciences degree.

Activism 
While still studying at the institute, in 1988, he was elected as chairman of the faculty branch of the Ukrainian Language Society, which was engaged in the struggle for teaching in the Ukrainian language.

In 1989 he took part in the creation of People's Movement of Ukraine. In 1990 he participated in the Revolution on Granite.

From 1990 to 1992 he was head of the paramilitary organization "Guard of the Movement". In 1991, he took part in the January events in Vilnius as a volunteer and organizer of humanitarian aid.

Since 1992 - Chairman of the Board of the Young Ukraine Foundation.

Political career 
In 1991, together with Yaroslav Andrushkiv, Andriy Parubiy and Oleh Tyahnybok, he founded the Social National Party of Ukraine (SNPU). Yuriy Kryvoruchko was a public leader and was responsible for ideological work.

In 1992 he served as a senior officer in the Department of Psychology of the Social and Psychological Department of the Ministry of Defense of Ukraine.

From 1994 to 1997 he was serving as a member of the Lviv Regional Council of the II democratic convocation.

In 1997 he left the SNPU without conflicts due to a different vision of its development with the leadership and joined the People's Movement of Ukraine.

At the 1998 parliamentary elections, he was elected into the national parliament.

From 1995 to 2009 he was a member of the National Council for Youth Policy.

Since 2003 he has held the position of Deputy Chairman of the National Council of Youth Organizations of Ukraine, and since 2004 - Deputy Chairman of the Ukrainian National Committee of Youth Organizations.

He took part in the 2004 Orange Revolution. In 2006 he became the chairman of the Ukrainian Youth Forum.

At the 2002 parliamentary elections, he was reelected into the national parliament.

Awards 

  1999: Third Class of the Order of Merit of the Ukraine
  2008: Second Class of the Order of Merit of the Ukraine
  2020: The Medal of January 13

References 

1966 births
Living people
Politicians from Lviv
Lawyers from Lviv
Danylo Halytsky Lviv National Medical University alumni
University of Lviv alumni
Recipients of the Order of Merit (Ukraine), 2nd class
Recipients of the Order of Merit (Ukraine), 3rd class
People's Movement of Ukraine politicians
Fourth convocation members of the Verkhovna Rada
Third convocation members of the Verkhovna Rada
Ukrainian psychiatrists
Recipients of the Honorary Diploma of the Cabinet of Ministers of Ukraine
Members of the Lviv Oblast Council